During the 2014–15 season PSV Eindhoven participated in the Dutch Eredivisie, the KNVB Cup, and the UEFA Europa League. The first training took place on Tuesday 24 June 2014. The traditional PSV Fan Day was held on Saturday 2 August 2014.

Season summary

2015 Maspalomas International Football Tournament
On 4 January, during the winter break, PSV left for a nine-day training camp on Gran Canaria, Spain. There, PSV participated in the XXX International Football Tournament of Maspalomas (es), a friendly football tournament held from 10 January to 13 January. The other participating teams were Celtic from Scotland and Sparta Prague from the Czech Republic. PSV defeated both teams, winning the Maspalomas trophy (es).

First-team squad

On loan

Transfers

Summer

In:

Out:

Competitions

Eredivisie

Results summary

Results by round

Matches

League table

KNVB Cup

UEFA Europa League

Qualifying Stages

Group stage

Knockout stage

Player statistics

Appearances and goals

|-
|colspan="14"|Players away from PSV on loan:
|-
|colspan="14"|Players who appeared for PSV no longer at the club:
|}

Goal scorers

Disciplinary Record

Notes
The match was abandoned at half-time due to heavy rainfall, and was resumed on 28 November 2014, 17:00, from the point of abandonment.''

References

PSV Eindhoven seasons
Psv Eindhoven
Psv Eindhoven
Dutch football championship-winning seasons